The Ideal 18 is a Canadian trailerable sailboat that was designed by Bruce Kirby as a one design racer and first built in 1989.

Production
The design was built by Ontario Yachts in Burlington, Ontario, Canada and also by Shumway Marine in Rochester, New York, United States, where production continues. By 1994, 60 boats had been completed and by 2020, 325 boats had been built.

Design
The Ideal 18 is a recreational keelboat, built predominantly of fibreglass. It has a fractional sloop rig with aluminum spars and swept spreaders. The hull has a raked stem, a walk-through reverse transom, an internally mounted spade-type rudder controlled by a wooden tiller and a fixed fin keel. It displaces  and carries  of fibreglass-encased lead ballast. It has built-in flotation for safety.

The design has a hinged mast for ease of ground transport.

For sailing the design is equipped with a roller furling jib. The seating is on benches moulded into the cockpit sides. The boat has no winches and does not require them. The boat is a displacement, non-planing, design.

The design has a Portsmouth Yardstick racing average handicap of 99.6 and is normally raced with a crew of two sailors, although the cockpit can accommodate four adults.

Operational history
In a 1994 review, Richard Sherwood described the Ideal 18 as, "a strong little keelboat designed for club racing, with rigid rules, such as only one set of sails a year, and no hiking. The jib barely overlaps, is a decksweeper, is self-tacking, and has roller furling. (The roller furling gear is set below deck level.)"

See also
List of sailing boat types

References

External links

Keelboats
Trailer sailers
1980s sailboat type designs
Sailing yachts
Sailboat type designs by Bruce Kirby
Sailboat types built by Ontario Yachts
Sailboat types built by Shumway Marine